Taxus mairei, Maire's yew, is a species of conifer in the yew family Taxaceae, native to Nepal, Assam, central and southern China, Hainan, Taiwan and Vietnam. It is extensively harvested for its paclitaxel (taxol) content in China.

References

mairei
Flora of Nepal
Flora of Assam (region)
Flora of North-Central China
Flora of South-Central China
Flora of Southeast China
Flora of Hainan
Flora of Taiwan
Flora of Vietnam
Plants described in 1960